The northern velvet gecko (Oedura castelnaui) is a species of lizard in the family Diplodactylidae. The species is endemic to Queensland in Australia.

Etymology
The specific name, castelnaui, is in honor of French naturalist Francis de Laporte de Castelnau.

Geographic range
O. castelnaui is found on the Cape York Peninsula, Queensland, Australia.

Habitat
The preferred natural habitats of O. castelnaui are forest and savanna.

Reproduction
O. castelnaui is oviparous. Clutch size is two eggs, which have a parchment-like shell, and hatch in 60 days.

References

Further reading
Bustard, H. Robert (1970). "Oedura marmorata, a complex of Australian geckos (Reptilia: Gekkonidae)". Senckenbergiana Biologica 51: 21–40. (Oedura castelnaui, new combination).
Cogger HG (2014). Reptiles and Amphibians of Australia, Seventh Edition. Clayton, Victoria, Australia: CSIRO Publishing. xxx + 1,033 pp. .
Thominot, Alexandre (1889). "Sur quelques reptiles et batraciens de la collection du Muséum d'histoire naturelle de Paris ". Bulletin de la Société Philomathique de Paris, Huitième Série [Eighth Series] 1 (1): 21–30. (Phyllodactylus castelnaui, new species, pp. 22–23). (in French).
Wilson K, Swan G (2013). A Complete Guide to Reptiles of Australia, Fourth Edition. Sydney: New Holland Publishers. 522 pp. .

Oedura
Reptiles described in 1889
Taxa named by Alexandre Thominot
Geckos of Australia